Lake Kazuni is a lake of Malawi. It is located in the Vwaza Marsh Game Reserve.

The Kazuni Safari Camp is an important accommodation area near the lake. The lake supports a significant hippo population.

Kazuni
Geography of Northern Region, Malawi